Prodiplosis is a genus of gall midges, insects in the family Cecidomyiidae. There are about 11 described species in Prodiplosis.

Species
These 11 species belong to the genus Prodiplosis:
 Prodiplosis citrulli (Felt, 1935) i c g
 Prodiplosis falcata Gagne, 1986 i c g
 Prodiplosis floricola (Felt, 1907) i c g
 Prodiplosis longifila Gagne, 1986 i c g
 Prodiplosis morrisi Gagne, 1966 i c g
 Prodiplosis myricae (Beutenmuller, 1907) i c g
 Prodiplosis platani Gagne, 1986 i c g
 Prodiplosis rhenana (Rübsaamen, 1910) c g
 Prodiplosis spatulata Jaiswal, 1989 c g
 Prodiplosis vaccinii (Felt, 1926) i c g
 Prodiplosis violicola (Coquillett, 1900) i c g b
Data sources: i = ITIS, c = Catalogue of Life, g = GBIF, b = Bugguide.net

References

Further reading

 
 
 
 
 

Cecidomyiinae
Articles created by Qbugbot
Cecidomyiidae genera